La Luna Sangre is a 2017 Philippine horror-fantasy drama television series. Directed by Richard Arellano, Rory Quintos and Mae Cruz-Alviar, it stars Kathryn Bernardo, Daniel Padilla, Richard Gutierrez, and Angel Locsin. It is the third installment of Lobo and the sequel to Imortal. The series  premiered on ABS-CBN's Primetime Bida evening block and worldwide on The Filipino Channel on June 19, 2017 to March 2, 2018, replacing My Dear Heart.

This horror-fantasy drama television series is about Malia, Mateo and Lia's daughter, who finds her place in the world of mortals, while training for the time when she must fight against the cursed vampire, Supremo. But while preparing for her destined battle, she meets Tristan, a man whose past experiences will turn him into someone that will love but also destroy Malia.

Episodes

2017

June 2017

July 2017

August 2017

September 2017

October 2017

November 2017

December 2017

2018

January 2018

February 2018

March 2018

References

Lists of Philippine drama television series episodes